Gender disappointment is the feeling of sadness when a parent's strong desire for a child of a particular, preferred sex is not met. The feeling has been linked to the prevalence of the sexist and gender essentialist beliefs.

In extreme cases gender disappointment can lead to infanticide, particularly (in modern era), female infanticide or neonaticide.

Factors contributing to gender disappointment 
Due to the set of expectations, parents place in their offsprings, some cultures are more prone to gender disappointment then others. In Asian countries the following factors can contribute to fuel gender disappointment, after the birth of a female child:

 Economic expectations, especially if sons are expected to financially care for elderly parents and/ or the payment of dowry for brides is expected
 Social and/ or family pressure
 Safety of the offspring, partially related to crime rates against girls in many countries
 Cultural expectations, e.g. in India sons are supposed to take care of the parents' funeral

See also 

 Antenatal depression
 Gendercide
 Postpartum depression
 Psychiatric disorders of childbirth
 Female infanticide
 Neonaticide
 Female infanticide in India
 Female infanticide in Pakistan
 Female infanticide in China
 Female Infanticide Prevention Act, 1870

References 

Sexism
Grief
Symptoms and signs of mental disorders